This is a list of events in British radio during 2016.

Events

January
18 January – Following Global Radio's purchase of Liverpool station Juice 107.6, the station is relaunched as Capital Liverpool.

February
19 February – BBC Radio Bristol stops broadcasting on MW following the sale of the land, on which the transmitter was located, to developers. In order to mitigate the loss of coverage the BBC switched on four new DAB transmitters in the area to help boost the station’s DAB coverage.
25 February – Tony Blackburn was dismissed by the BBC and Mark Goodier takes over as temporary host of Pick of the Pops.
29 February – 
The UK’s second national commercial multiplex starts broadcasting. However, only 73% of the UK's population is able to receive it.
 Absolute 80s, Planet Rock and Premier Christian Radio switch from Digital One to the new multiplex although the stations continue to broadcast on Digital One until the end of April.
Jazz FM is made available nationally as a digital station again after leaving the national DAB multiplex at the end of 2013.

March
March – Manchester station Real Radio XS is rebranded as XS Manchester.

April
9 April – Shortly after leaving BBC Breakfast, Bill Turnbull joins Classic FM to present the station’s weekend morning shows.
April – After two months of broadcasting on both national commercial multiplexes, Absolute 80s and Planet Rock stop broadcasting on Digital One. Consequently, the stations are no longer available on DAB in  Devon, Cornwall, Dorset, parts of Scotland and Wales due to the reduced reach of the Sound Digital multiplex.

May
6 May – Orion Media announces that they have been bought by Bauer for an undisclosed fee, reportedly between £40 and £50 million.  This gives Bauer the West Midlands network of Free Radio stations and East Midlands regional station Gem 106.
17 May – The Free Radio network's head of sport, Tom Ross, presents his final programme after 35 years working for BRMB, Xtra AM, Capital Gold and Free Radio.
20 May – Talksport is awarded the right to broadcast three Premier League UK live audio packages for the next three football seasons, starting with the 2016/17 season.

June
1 June – A previous jingle package produced for Smooth Radio has been re-recorded for United Arab Emirates station 92 Smooth by Salford based Ignite Jingles.
21 June – The BBC completes its roll-out of BBC Local Radio on Freeview.
22 June – Jazz FM announces it will extend its morning business programme, Business Breakfast from 30 minutes to an hour on 24 June to cover the results of the EU membership referendum.

July
9 July – Paul Gambaccini replaces Tony Blackburn as host of Pick of the Pops.

August
15 August – Jazz FM introduces a new schedule. Clare Anderson's The Late Lounge is dropped, while Mark Walker succeeds Helen Mayhew as presenter of Dinner Jazz. New one-hour programmes are also introduced at 6pm.

September
17 September – After 35 years, Robbie Shepherd retires as host of BBC Radio Scotland’s Take the Floor show.
 19 September – BBC Cymru launches a pop-up radio station,  (Radio Cymru More), broadcasting for three months in the run-up to BBC Radio Cymru's 40th anniversary. Consisting of five hours of music-led entertainment programming each weekday, Radio Cymru Mwy is available on DAB in south east Wales and online.

October
28 October – Desmond Carrington presents his final show for BBC Radio 2, having presented weekly shows for the station for the past 37 years.

November
No events.

December
31 December – Tony Blackburn returns to BBC Radio 2.

Station debuts
29 February – Heart Extra
15 March – 
Mellow Magic
Talksport 2
21 March – Talkradio
27 March – Premier Praise
28 March – Magic Chilled
30 March – Virgin Radio
9 September – Union JACK

Programme debuts
 30 May – The Break on BBC Radio 4 (2016–2020)
 5 November – 50 Things That Made the Modern Economy on the BBC World Service (2016–2017)

Continuing radio programmes

1940s
 The Sunday Hour (1940–2018)
 Desert Island Discs (1942 – present)
 Woman's Hour (1946 – present)
 A Book at Bedtime (1949 – present)

1950s
 The Archers (1950 – present)
 The Today Programme (1957 – present)

1960s
 Farming Today (1960 – present)
 In Touch (1961–Present)
 The World at One (1965 – present)
 The Official Chart (1967 – present)
 Just a Minute (1967 – present)
 The Living World (1968 – present)
 The Organist Entertains (1969–2018)

1970s
 PM (1970 – present)
 Start the Week (1970 – present)
 You and Yours (1970 – present)
 I'm Sorry I Haven't a Clue (1972 – present)
 Good Morning Scotland (1973 – present)
 Newsbeat (1973 – present)
 File on 4 (1977 – present)
 Money Box (1977 – present)
 The News Quiz (1977 – present)
 Feedback (1979 – present)
 The Food Programme (1979 – present)
 Science in Action (1979 – present)

1980s
 Steve Wright in the Afternoon (1981–1993, 1999 – present)
 In Business (1983 – present)
 Sounds of the 60s (1983 – present)
 Loose Ends (1986 – present)

1990s
 The Moral Maze (1990 – present)
 Essential Selection (1991 – present)
 Essential Mix (1993 – present)
 Up All Night (1994 – present)
 Wake Up to Money (1994 – present)
 Private Passions (1995 – present)
 In Our Time (1998 – present)
 Material World (1998 – present)
 Scott Mills (1998 – present)
 The Now Show (1998 – present)

2000s
 BBC Radio 2 Folk Awards (2000 – present)
 Big John @ Breakfast (2000 – present)
 Sounds of the 70s (2000–2008, 2009 – present)
 Dead Ringers (2000–2007, 2014 – present)
 Kermode and Mayo's Film Review (2001 – present)
 A Kist o Wurds (2002 – present)
 Fighting Talk (2003 – present)
 Jeremy Vine (2003 – present)
 The Chris Moyles Show (2004–2012, 2015 – present)
 Annie Mac (2004 – present)
 Elaine Paige on Sunday (2004 – present)
 The Bottom Line (2006 – present)
 The Christian O'Connell Breakfast Show (2006 – present)
 The Unbelievable Truth (2006 – present)
 Radcliffe & Maconie (2007 – present)
 Geoff Lloyd with Annabel Port (2008–2017)
 The Media Show (2008 – present)
 Newsjack (2009 – present)
 Paul O'Grady on the Wireless (2009 – present)
 Alan and Mel's Summer Escape (2009 – present)

2010s
 The Chris Evans Breakfast Show (2010–2018)
 Graham Norton (2010–2020)
 Simon Mayo Drivetime (2010–2018)
 The Third Degree (2011 – present)
 BBC Radio 1's Dance Anthems (2012 – present)
 Late Night Graham Torrington (2012–2020)
 The Radio 1 Breakfast Show with Nick Grimshaw (2012 – present)
 Sounds of the 80s (2013 – Present) 
 Question Time Extra Time (2013 – present)
 The Show What You Wrote (2013 – present)
 Friday Sports Panel (2014 – present)
 Home Front (2014 – present)
 Stumped (2015 – present)

Ending this year
28 October – The Music Goes Round (1981–2016)

Deaths
9 January – Ed Stewart ("Stewpot"), broadcast presenter (BBC Radio 2, BBC Radio 1) (Junior Choice) (stroke)
31 January – Sir Terry Wogan, broadcast presenter (BBC Radio 2, BBC Radio 1) (Wake Up to Wogan and Weekend Wogan) (cancer)
14 February – Ali Brownlee, football commentator (BBC Tees) (born 1959)
17 March – Cliff Michelmore, broadcast presenter (Family Favourites'') (born 1919)
21 October – Dave Cash, broadcast presenter (BBC Radio 1, Capital London, Primetime Radio) (heart attack)
7 November – Sir Jimmy Young, broadcast presenter (BBC Radio 2, BBC Radio 1, BBC Light Programme)
10 December – Ian McCaskill, weather forecaster (BBC Radio) (born 1938)

References

Radio
British Radio, 2016 In
Years in British radio